Microchess, by Peter R. Jennings, was the first commercially successful chess program for microcomputers.  Originally   designed for the MOS Technology KIM-1 it was released on December 18, 1976. Microchess, as small as it was in terms of program size, could still play passable chess on the KIM-1 with its 6502 microprocessor, 1 kilobyte of memory, simple hex keyboard, and seven-segment display.

Selling it at a price of US$10, Jennings refused to sell the rights of the program to Chuck Peddle (president of MOS Technology) for $1000. It was the first software package to sell 50,000 copies. Jennings founded Personal Software to publish Microchess to the nascent microcomputer market. Money made from Microchess and other software projects allowed Jennings, together with Dan Fylstra, to launch VisiCorp company, and underwrite the development of VisiCalc, the first spreadsheet.

Microchess was later expanded into a more fully featured program with graphics for the TRS-80, Apple II, Commodore PET and Atari 8-bit family computers. It was also licensed to Novag for its dedicated Chess Champion Mk II in 1979.

Reception
BYTE in 1981 stated that when chess programs such as Microchess appeared, "we all laughed and proceeded to demolish them ... microcomputer chess programs had a poor reputation". Tim Harding in 1985 called Microchess "dreadful".

See also 
1K ZX Chess
Sargon

References

External links
 Information on the history of Microchess, manuals, and complete source code
 Microchess port to MS-Windows 

1976 video games
Chess software
Apple II games
Atari 8-bit family games
Commodore PET games
TRS-80 games
TRS-80 Color Computer games